Dog Pound is a 2010 Canadian psychological thriller film directed and co-written by Kim Chapiron. It is a Canadian remake of the British borstal film Scum. This is Chapiron's only film to go direct-to-video.

Plot
Butch, Davis, and Angel are teenagers who have been sentenced to Enola Vale juvenile detention center in Montana. Correctional officer Sands does their initial intake, focusing on Butch, who has been imprisoned for attacking and blinding a correctional officer at another facility.

Goodyear, a tough but fair officer, urges the new inmates to follow the rules and quietly serve their time so they can earn a second chance on the outside. At first Butch attempts to conform to the rules, but soon he and his friends are attacked by the chief bully Banks and his thugs, Eckersley and Loony.

Refusing to reveal the names of his attackers, Butch is sent to solitary confinement. Once out, he immediately exacts revenge on Banks, Eckersley, and Loony. Butch saves the worst for Banks, who is savagely beaten. The beatings establish his rank among the inmates and offers temporary protection to his friends, Davis and Angel.

During a routine painting job, Angel and Goodyear get into a physical altercation; Angel is thrown against the wall by Goodyear - striking his head against some pipes and later dies at the hospital. Butch, who was a witness to the altercation, is placed in solitary confinement while an investigation takes place.

Without Butch's protection, Davis is raped by Loony and Eckersley. Davis tries to contact his mother during the night, but an officer denies his request, telling him he'll have to wait until morning. Feeling helpless, Davis goes back to his bunk, eventually committing suicide by slitting his wrists.

The deaths of both Angel and Davis result in their dormitory going on a hunger strike during breakfast. After a stare-down in the cafeteria where tempers flare, Butch loses control, throws a chair and instigates a full blown prison riot where he brutally attacks Loony. The detention officers are overwhelmed and return to the cafeteria in riot gear, using tear gas and plastic bullets in an attempt to end the riot. During the riot, Butch tries to escape the building, but is caught and beaten by the prison officers moments later, and is violently dragged back into the building.

Cast

Release
Dog Pound premiered at the Tribeca Film Festival on 24 April 2010. It was released in France on 23 June 2010, and in Canada on 7 September 2010. It was also released in the United States, Mexico, Switzerland (French speaking region only), Spain, and the United Kingdom.

Critical reception
 

Writing for CinemaBlend, reviewer Perri Nemiroff described the film as "intense" and not suited to the tastes of all viewers.

Awards
Dog Pound is French director Chapiron's first English-language feature, and the film earned him an award as Best New Narrative Filmmaker at the 2010 Tribeca Film Festival.

References

External links
 

2010 direct-to-video films
2010s English-language films
2010s prison drama films
2010 psychological thriller films
Canadian psychological thriller films
English-language Canadian films
Spanish-language Canadian films
Canadian prison drama films
Scanbox Entertainment films
2010s teen drama films
Films set in Montana
Films shot in New Brunswick
Canadian independent films
2010 drama films
2010s Spanish-language films
2010s Canadian films